A list of films released in Japan in 1983 (see 1983 in film).

See also
1983 in Japan
1983 in Japanese television

External links
 Japanese films of 1983 at the Internet Movie Database

1983
Lists of 1983 films by country or language
Films